Konstanty Romuald Budkiewicz (June 19, 1867 - March 31, 1923) was a Roman Catholic priest executed by the OGPU for organizing Nonviolent resistance against the First Soviet anti-religious campaign. He remains under investigation for possible sainthood. His current title is Servant of God.

Early life
Budkevich was born June 19, 1867 to a large Polish family  of Szlachta descent in Zubry manor near the town of Krāslava in modern Latvia. He completed his studies at the Saint Petersburg Roman Catholic Theological Academy, where he earned a doctorate in theology.  He was ordained to the priesthood in 1893 and taught in Pskov and, from 1896, in Vilnius.

Saint Petersburg
In 1903, he served the parish of St. Catherine on Nevsky Prospect in St. Petersburg, becoming pastor there in 1908. At the time, St. Petersburg was the center of the Empire's largest Polish community outside of Congress Poland and Budkiewicz desired to prevent the children of his parish from the anti-Polish and anti-Catholic propaganda of the State-run school system. Therefore, despite "manifold difficulties", he maintained a Polish language parochial school attached to St. Catherine's parish.

Following the February Revolution, then Archbishop Eduard von der Ropp, decreed that all his priests would take a role in organizing a Christian Democratic Party to participate in the planned Russian Constituent Assembly. In this, the Archbishop was opposed by Budkiewicz and by Auxiliary Bishop Jan Cieplak, who both opposed any politicization of the Catholic religion.

Red October and its aftermath
In 1918, he became vicar-general to Bishop Jan Cieplak.

According to Francis MacCullagh,

According to Princess Martha Edith Almedingen, "Sunday after Sunday at St. Catherine's he preached his simple unsophisticated sermons, and the keynote to all of them was, 'God is love, and it is given to us to be his true children.'"

The Cieplak Trial
He was arrested March 13, 1923 in connection with the case brought against the Catholic clergy, with Archbishop Cieplak at their head. The GPU feared that Archbishop Cieplak was planning to unite the Orthodox who followed Patriarch Tikhon with the Catholic Church. As Patriarch Tikhon was under house arrest on false charges of "anti-Soviet and counterrevolutionary activities", this "conspiracy" implicated Cieplak, Budkiewicz, (his Vicar General), and Byzantine Rite Exarch Leonid Feodorov in Anti-Soviet agitation.

According to Christopher Lawrence Zugger,

New York Herald correspondent Francis McCullagh, who was present at the trial, later described its fourth day as follows:

Also according to McCullagh,

On Palm Sunday, 1923, Cieplak and Budkiewicz were sentenced to death. The other fifteen defendants were sentenced to long terms in the GULAG. In the aftermath of sentencing, all were returned to their cells in Moscow's Butyrka prison.

Martyrdom
According to Christopher Lawrence Zugger, "The Vatican, Germany, Poland, Great Britain, and the United States undertook frantic efforts to save the Archbishop and his chancellor. In Moscow, the ministers from the Polish, British, Czechoslovak, and Italian missions appealed 'on the grounds of humanity,' and Poland offered to exchange any prisoner to save the archbishop and the monsignor. Finally, on March 29, the Archbishop's sentence was commuted to ten years in prison, ... but the Monsignor was not to be spared. Again, there were appeals from foreign powers, from Western Socialists and Church leaders alike. These appeals were for naught: Pravda editorialized on March 30 that the tribunal was defending the rights of the workers, who had been oppressed by the bourgeouis system for centuries with the aid of priests. Pro-Communist foreigners who intervened for the two men were also condemned as 'compromisers with the priestly servants of the bourgeoisie.'"

According to the priest Francis Rutkowski, who was imprisoned with Budkiewicz,

Legacy
After the execution of Budkiewicz, his body was buried in a mass grave in the forests of the Sokolniki District.

According to Christopher Zugger, "On Easter Sunday, the world was told that the Monsignor was  still alive, and Pope Pius XI publicly prayed at St. Peter's that the Soviets would spare his life. Moscow officials told foreign ministers and reporters that the Monsignor's sentence was just, and that the Soviet Union was a sovereign nation that would accept no interference. In reply to an appeal from the rabbis of New York City to spare Budkiewicz's life, Pravda wrote a blistering editorial against 'Jewish bankers who rule the world' and bluntly warned that the Soviets would kill Jewish opponents of the Revolution as well. Only on April 4 did the truth finally emerge: the Monsignor had already been in the grave for three days. When the news came to Rome, Pope Pius fell to his knees and wept as he prayed for the priest's soul. To make matters worse, Cardinal Gasparri had just finished reading a note from the Soviets saying that 'everything was proceeding satisfactorily' when he was handed the telegram announcing the execution."

News of Budkevich's execution caused turmoil in France, whose Catholic population deplored the incident and saw it as an example of the police state tactics of the new Soviet Union.

On 7 April 1923, a Roman Catholic requiem mass was offered for Budkiewicz at St. Catherine's Cathedral in St. Petersburg. Several foreign diplomats were in attendance.

On 10 April 1923, Soviet Foreign Commissar Georgy Chicherin wrote a letter to fellow  Politburo member Joseph Stalin, in which he described the political fallout from the death of Budkiewicz. In America, France, and the United Kingdom, efforts to gain diplomatic recognition for the USSR had suffered a major setback. In Westminster, Labour MPs had been flooded by petitions "demanding the defense of Cieplak and Budkiewicz", by "worker's organizations", "dying socialists", and "professionalists". In the United States, Republican Senator William Borah had been about to discuss possible recognition of the USSR with U.S. Secretary of State Charles Evans Hughes. Due to Budkevich's execution, the meeting had been cancelled and the senator had been forced to indefinitely postpone the founding of a committee to press for diplomatic negotiations. Chicherin explained that the outside world saw the continuing anti-religious campaign "as nothing other than naked religious persecution." Chicherin expressed fear that, if Russian Orthodox Patriarch Tikhon were also sentenced to death, the news would, "worsen much further our international position in all our relations." He concluded by proposing "the rejection in advance of the death sentence on Tikhon".

Constantine Budkiewicz's cause for sainthood was opened in 2003 and remains under investigation. His current title is Servant of God. At St. Catherine's Cathedral, his stole is preserved as a relic. A street in Warsaw is also named for him.

In popular culture
 In 1924, Captain Francis McCullagh published the full text of the Cieplak show trial within a book entitled The Bolshevik Persecution of Christianity, which was swiftly translated into French, German and Spanish.
 Also in 1924, Kazimiera Iłłakowiczówna, a highly important figure in Polish poetry, published a book of poems in honor of Monsignor Budkiewicz's life and death. Modeled after the traditional oral poetry of the Polish peasantry, the collection was titled Opowieść o moskiewskim męczeństwie ("The Story of the Moscow Martyr").

Quotes

Further reading
 Father Joseph Ledit, S.J., Archbishop John Baptist Cieplak, Palm Publishers Limited, Montreal, 1963.
 Francis MacCullagh, The Bolshevik Persecution of Christianity, E. P. Dutton and Company, 1924.
 Father Christopher Lawrence Zugger, The Forgotten: Catholics in the Soviet Empire from Lenin through Stalin, Syracuse University Press, 2001.

References

External links
  Fr. Constantine Budkiewicz
  Servant of God Constantine (Romuald Julianovich) Budkiewicz
  Allocution of Pope Pius XI, March 22, 1923.

1867 births
1923 deaths
19th-century Polish Roman Catholic priests
Catholic people executed by the Soviet Union
Executed Polish people
Latvian people executed by the Soviet Union
Latvian Roman Catholics
People executed by the Soviet Union by firearm
People from Dvinsky Uyezd
People from Krāslava Municipality
19th-century Polish nobility
Polish people executed by the Soviet Union
Polish Servants of God
Soviet show trials
20th-century Polish nobility